Dave MacFarlane (16 January 1967 – 30 October 2013) was a Scottish professional football player who is best known for his time with Kilmarnock.

MacFarlane began his career with Ayr United Boys Club before joining Rangers. Whilst at Ibrox he made seven league appearances and picked up a winner's medal in October 1986 when he came on as a second-half substitute in Rangers 2–1 win over Celtic in the Scottish League Cup Final. MacFarlane also had loan spells with Kilmarnock and Dundee, before joining the former on a permanent basis in 1988. He spent nearly two seasons at Rugby Park.

A brief spell with Partick Thistle followed before MacFarlane moved to the junior leagues to Glenafton Athletic, who were managed by Scottish former international goalkeeper Alan Rough. He became a regular pick for the junior side and played in three consecutive Scottish Junior Cup finals, winning the trophy in 1992.

References

External links

1967 births
2013 deaths
Footballers from Irvine, North Ayrshire
Rangers F.C. players
Dundee F.C. players
Association football midfielders
Kilmarnock F.C. players
Partick Thistle F.C. players
Scottish footballers
Scottish Football League players
Glenafton Athletic F.C. players
Scottish expatriate footballers
Expatriate soccer players in Australia
Caroline Springs George Cross FC players
Scottish expatriate sportspeople in Australia